Bhagalpur district is one of the thirty-eight districts of Bihar state, India, and Bhagalpur town is the administrative headquarters of this district.

Geography
Bhagalpur district is a part of Bhagalpur Division. The river Ganga flows through the district.

National protected area
Vikramshila Gangetic Dolphin Sanctuary

Politics 
  

|}

Economy
In 2006 the Indian government named Bhagalpur one of the country's 250 Rank 3 backward districts (out of a total of 640). It is one of the 38 districts in Bihar currently receiving funds from the Backward Regions Grant Fund Programme (BRGF).

A 1320MW Thermal Power Plant is going to establish at Pirapinti with a J.V of NHPC, Bihar State Power Generation Company (BSPGCL) and Nalanda Power Company, a subsidiary of RPG Groups.

According to Geological Survey of India, the coal reserve of 1366.75 metric ton has been discovered in Srinagar, Laxmipur, Mandar and Pirpainti block of Bhagalpur district. Bharat Coking Coal Limited is to start mining operations as of September 2019.

Demographics

According to the 2011 census Bhagalpur district has a population of 3,037,766. This gives it a ranking of 120th in India (out of a total of 640). Its population growth rate over the decade 2001–2011 was 25.36%. Bhagalpur has a sex ratio of 880 females for every 1000 males, and a literacy rate of 63.14%. 19.83% of the population lives in urban areas. Scheduled Castes and Scheduled Tribes made up 10.49% and 2.21% of the population respectively.

Languages

At the time of the 2011 Census of India, 23.40% of the population in the district spoke Hindi, 10.29% Urdu and 2.09% Bhojpuri as their first language. 62.94% of the population spoke languages classified as 'Others' under Hindi on the census.

The primary language used in the district is Angika, sometimes regarded as a dialect of Maithili Other chief languages include Hindi, Urdu and Bengali language.

Flora and fauna

References

External links

 
Districts of Bihar
Bhagalpur division